Juan Camilo Salazar Hinestrosa (born 29 June 1997) is a Colombian professional footballer who plays as a right winger for Primera División club FAS.

Career
Salazar began his career with Millonarios. His professional bow came in a fixture with Deportivo Cali in Categoría Primera A on 24 February 2018, with the defender being substituted on in place of Christian Huérfano on seventy-two minutes in a 2–0 loss. Salazar scored his opening senior goal against Deportivo Pasto in April, which was the first of three overall goals across thirty-nine fixtures in all competitions across the 2018 campaign. On 31 January 2019, three days after featuring in the club's 2019 opener versus Envigado, Salazar departed to Argentina to join San Lorenzo.

Career statistics
.

References

External links

1997 births
Living people
Sportspeople from Valle del Cauca Department
Colombian footballers
Association football wingers
Colombian expatriate footballers
Expatriate footballers in Argentina
Colombian expatriate sportspeople in Argentina
Categoría Primera A players
Millonarios F.C. players
San Lorenzo de Almagro footballers